Parsberg is a town in the county of Neumarkt in Bavaria, Germany. It is 23 km southeast of Neumarkt in der Oberpfalz, and 33 km northwest of Regensburg, next to the A3 autobahn, the main route from Nuremberg to Regensburg (and then on into Austria).  It was formerly the seat of the Counts of Parsberg, whose coat of arms is now used by the town.

People 
 Ludwig Stiegler (born 1945), German politician (SPD)

References

External links
 History of Parsberg (pdf in German)
 History of the Coat of Arms of Parsberg
 

Neumarkt (district)
Municipalities in Bavaria